Dattatray Vithoba Bharane  is an Indian politician.He Served as Minister of State in Government of Maharashtra in Thackeray Ministry he was also Gaurdian Minister of Solapur District. He is Member of Legislative Assembly (MLA) from Indapur Constituency.

References

Living people
Maharashtra MLAs 2014–2019
Nationalist Congress Party politicians from Maharashtra
Year of birth missing (living people)